Lawrence Barkley "Kitty" Creson (January 17, 1906 – June 19, 1972) was a college football and baseball player who later served as an associate justice of the Supreme Court of Tennessee.

Vanderbilt University
He graduated with a LL B. from Vanderbilt University in 1928. At Vanderbilt, Creson was a member of the Sigma Alpha Epsilon fraternity.

Football
Creson was a prominent end for Dan McGugin's Vanderbilt Commodores of Vanderbilt University, a teammate and target of College Football Hall of Fame quarterback Bill Spears. Wallace Wade called Creson one of the best tackle blockers he ever saw. Creson often played next to inexperienced tackles, and was called upon to block the other team's tackle.

1927
He was selected All-Southern in 1927. Creson was noted as an exemplary product of former end and assistant coach Hek Wakefield.

Baseball
He also was a pitcher on the baseball team.

Judge
Creson was appointed Associate Justice of the Supreme Court of Tennessee by Governor Frank G. Clement on August 1, 1965, following the death of Justice Andrew O. Holmes. He served in that capacity until his death, in 1972.

References

Baseball players from Memphis, Tennessee
Players of American football from Memphis, Tennessee
Vanderbilt Commodores football players
American football ends
All-Southern college football players
Vanderbilt Commodores baseball players
Baseball pitchers
1906 births
1972 deaths
Justices of the Tennessee Supreme Court
20th-century American judges